This list of National Hockey League (NHL) players is divided into the following lists:

By name
A • B • C • D • E • F • G • H • I • J • K • L • M • N • O • P • Q • R • S • T • U • V • W • X • Y • Z

By team

Current

List of Anaheim Ducks players
List of Arizona Coyotes players
List of Boston Bruins players
List of Buffalo Sabres players
List of Calgary Flames players
List of Carolina Hurricanes players
List of Chicago Blackhawks players
List of Colorado Avalanche players
List of Columbus Blue Jackets players
List of Dallas Stars players
List of Detroit Red Wings players
List of Edmonton Oilers players
List of Florida Panthers players
List of Los Angeles Kings players
List of Minnesota Wild players
List of Montreal Canadiens players
List of Nashville Predators players
List of New Jersey Devils players
List of New York Islanders players
List of New York Rangers players
List of Ottawa Senators players
List of Philadelphia Flyers players
List of Pittsburgh Penguins players
List of San Jose Sharks players
List of Seattle Kraken players
List of St. Louis Blues players
List of Tampa Bay Lightning players
List of Toronto Maple Leafs players
List of Vancouver Canucks players
List of Vegas Golden Knights players
List of Washington Capitals players
List of Winnipeg Jets players

Defunct

List of Atlanta Flames players
List of Atlanta Thrashers players
List of Cleveland Barons players
List of Colorado Rockies players
List of Hamilton Tigers players
List of Hartford Whalers players
List of Kansas City Scouts players
List of Minnesota North Stars players
List of Montreal Maroons players
List of Montreal Wanderers players
List of New York Americans players
List of Ottawa Senators (1883-1954) players
List of Oakland Seals players
List of Philadelphia Quakers players
List of Pittsburgh Pirates players
List of Quebec Nordiques players
List of St. Louis Eagles players
List of Winnipeg Jets (1979–96) players

By a statistic
 List of NHL statistical leaders
 List of goaltenders who have scored a goal in an NHL game
 List of players with five or more goals in an NHL game
 List of players with eight or more points in an NHL game
 List of NHL players with 50-goal seasons
 List of NHL players with 100-point seasons
 List of NHL goaltenders with 300 wins
 List of NHL players with 500 consecutive games played
 List of NHL players with 500 goals
 List of NHL players with 1,000 assists
 List of NHL players with 1,000 games played
 List of NHL players with 1,000 points
 List of NHL players with 2,000 career penalty minutes

By specific group
 List of first overall NHL draft picks
 List of undrafted NHL players with 100 games played
 List of NHL players who spent their entire career with one franchise
 List of players who played only one game in the NHL
 List of oldest National Hockey League players
 List of NHL players who have signed offer sheets

By demographics
 List of black NHL players
 List of Latvians in the NHL
 List of Slovaks in the NHL
 List of National Hockey League players born in the United Kingdom
 List of NHL statistical leaders by country
 List of countries with their first National Hockey League player

See also
 List of current NHL Eastern Conference team rosters
 List of current NHL Western Conference team rosters
 List of current NHL captains and alternate captains
 List of WHA players

 
Players
Players